The 1993 Mr. Olympia contest was an IFBB professional bodybuilding competition held on September 11, 1993, at the Atlanta Civic Center in Atlanta, Georgia.

Results
The total prize money awarded was $275,000.

Notable events
Dorian Yates won his second consecutive Mr. Olympia title
Lou Ferrigno makes his final Mr. Olympia appearance
Ray McNeil would only appear at this Mr Olympia before his murder in 1995.

References

External links 
 Mr. Olympia
 1993 Mr. Olympia Finals (video)

 1993
1993 in American sports
Mr. Olympia
1993 in bodybuilding